The fourth running of the women's event of the Three Days of Bruges–De Panne, also called Oxyclean Classic Brugge–De Panne, will be held on 25 March 2021.  It is the third race of the 2021 UCI Women's World Tour.

Teams
All nine UCI Women's WorldTeams and fourteen UCI Women's Continental Teams competed in the race. Of these twenty-three teams, only two did not enter with the maximum squad of six riders:  entered five and  entered four.  were expected to participate, but they withdrew shortly before the race. 106 of the 135 riders in the race finished.

UCI Women's WorldTeams

 
 
 
 
 
 
 
 
 

UCI Women's Continental Teams

Results

References

External links
 

Classic Brugge–De Panne
Three Days of Bruges–De Panne
Classic Brugge–De Panne
Classic Brugge–De Panne (women's race)